Stephanus Francois Nieuwoudt (born 27 August 1996) is a South African professional rugby union player who last played for the  in the Currie Cup and in the Rugby Challenge. He usually plays as a flanker.

Rugby career

Youth rugby

Nieuwoudt attended Hoërskool Framesby, where he also played rugby for the first team. In 2014, he was selected to represent his local provincial union, Eastern Province, at the Under-18 Craven Week competition held in Middelburg. He started in their wins over the Blue Bulls and Free State in their first two matches to help Eastern Province qualify to play in the final match of the competition against SWD. He also started their final match and scored a try shortly after half-time in a 25–7 victory as Eastern Province were crowned unofficial Craven Week champions for the first time in twenty years.

In 2015, Nieuwoudt joined the Eastern Province academy and he was included in the  squad that participated in Group A of the Under-19 Provincial Championship. He immediately established himself as a regular for the team, eventually starting all of their matches in the competition. The team started the season in fine form, winning the first ten matches in a row. Nieuwoudt scored tries in their matches against ,  and  during this run, before scoring two tries in their match against  in their only defeat of the regular season, as they lost 26–49 in Pretoria. He scored one more try in their final match of the regular season, as they bounced back to beat  23–6 to finish top of the log to secure a home semi-final. Nieuwoudt's six tries was the joint-second most by an Eastern Province player behind Junior Pokomela's eight.

2016–present : Eastern Province Kings

At the start of 2016, Nieuwoudt was included in the  squad that participated in the 2016 Varsity Cup tournament.

In March 2016, Nieuwoudt was included in a 56-man South Africa Under-20 training squad as the team prepared for the 2016 World Rugby Under 20 Championship, but was not named in a 36-man provisional squad named a week later.

In addition to making his first senior start, Nieuwoudt also took less than ten minutes to score his first try in first class rugby as the Eastern Province Kings won the match 31–18.

References

South African rugby union players
Living people
1996 births
Rugby union players from Port Elizabeth
Rugby union flankers
Eastern Province Elephants players